The athletics department of Panathinaikos A.O. was founded in 1919 by the football players of the team. Amongst its first athletes were Giorgos Kalafatis, Apostolos Nikolaidis, Loukas Panourgias and Michalis Papazoglou. It is the second oldest department of the club operating continuously since its foundation, only behind the football department.

In the 1928 Summer Olympics the athlete of the team, Antonis Kariofilis, became the first Greek to open the parade of nations.

After World War II, a strong team was created with Giannis Lambrou, Rigas Efstathiadis, Antonis Tritsis and others. In the 1960s the great pole vaulter Christos Papanikolaou also joined the team.

Through the next decades Panathinaikos won many Championships, in both men and women, becoming one of the strongest teams in the country. The men's team were Greek champions for 20 seasons in a row from 1955 to 1974, a record for Greek athletics until present day.

Current men's roster
 Panayotis Bourikas
 Aggelos Deligiannis
 Konstantinos Gavalas
 Konstantinos Gkelaouzos
 Petros Hatziou
 Thanasis Kalakos
 Spiros Karalis
 Christos Kosmidis
 Haralabos Lagos
 Dimitris Levantinos
 Vasilis Mirianthopoulos
 Anestis Papoulias
 Christos Papoulias
 Vaggelis Plavoukos
 Stelios Skordilis
 Panayotis Trivizas
 Vasilis Vlahos

Current women's roster
 Artemis Anastasiou
 Dimitra Gnafaki
 Georgia Despollari
 Anthi-Koraini Kiriakopoulou
 Anastasia Marinakou
 Pinelopi Nika
 Konstantina Romaiou
 Vasiliki Tachtara
 Konstantina Giannopoulou

Honours
 Greek Championship, Men: (23): 1955, 1956, 1957, 1958, 1959, 1960, 1961, 1962, 1963, 1964, 1965, 1966, 1967, 1968, 1969, 1970, 1971, 1972, 1973, 1974, 1977, 1989, 1990
 Greek Indoor Championship, Men: (4): 1986, 1989, 1990, 2023
 Greek Cross Country Championship, Men: (27) (record):  1930, 1931, 1932, 1933, 1934, 1938, 1954, 1955, 1956, 1968, 1969, 1970, 1971, 1972, 1973, 1974, 1975, 1977, 1978, 1979, 1980, 1983, 1996, 1997, 2012, 2016, 2021
 Greek Championship, Women: (3): 1946, 1947, 1949
 Greek Indoor Championship, Women: (1): 2023
 Greek Cross Country Championship, Women: (8): 1949, 1950, 1983, 1984, 1985, 1986, 2017, 2022

Notable athletes
  Stylianos Kyriakides
  Hrysopiyi Devetzi
  Rigas Efstathiadis
  Aris Karageorgos
  Giannis Lambrou
  Alexandra Papageorgiou
  Christos Papanikolaou
  Michalis Papazoglou
  Hristos Polihroniou
  Konstantinos Poulios
  Nikolaos Regoukos
  Georgios Roubanis
  Antonis Tritsis
  Pavlos Tzanavaras
  Spilios Zacharopoulos

Sources
 100 years Panathinaikos, Liveri, 2008
 Official website

External links
 Official page (in Greek)
 "Leoforos Dromeon" (annual 5k and 10k race organised by the club, in Greek)

 
Panathinaikos A.O.
Athletics in Athens
Athletics clubs in Greece
Running clubs in Greece
1919 establishments in Greece
Sports clubs established in 1919